Roswell Peter Bishop (January 6, 1843 – March 4, 1920) was an American Civil War veteran, lawyer, and a politician from the U.S. state of Michigan. He served six terms in the United States House of Representatives from 1895 to 1907.

Early life, Civil War service and education
Bishop was born in Sidney, New York, and attended Unadilla Academy, Cooperstown Seminary and Walton Academy, all in Upstate New York, after which he taught school for several years.

During the American Civil War, he enlisted as a private in Company C, Forty-third Regiment, New York Volunteer Infantry, in 1861, and was discharged in December 1862 because of a wound which necessitated the amputation of his right arm.

He entered the University of Michigan in September 1868 where he remained until December 1872. He studied law, was admitted to the bar in Ann Arbor in May 1875, and commenced practice in Ludington, Michigan.

Political career
He was elected prosecuting attorney of Mason County in 1876, 1878, and 1884. He was a member of the Michigan State House of Representatives in 1882 and 1892.

Bishop was elected as a Republican from Michigan's 9th congressional district to the United States House of Representatives for the 54th Congress and to the five succeeding Congresses, serving from March 4, 1895, until March 3, 1907. He was chairman of the House Committee on Ventilation and Acoustics in the 57th through 59th Congresses.

He was an unsuccessful candidate for re-nomination in 1906 and resumed the practice of law in Ludington. He served as a member of the Michigan constitutional convention in 1907 and was appointed a member of the Spanish Treaty Claims Commission in December 1907 and served until the work of the commission was completed.

After Congress
He moved to Hollister, California, in 1910 and engaged in fruit growing. He died at Pacific Grove, California, aged 77, and is interred in the El Carmelo Cemetery there.

His former home 302 N. Harrison Street in Ludington, erected in 1892, has been the rectory  of Grace Episcopal Church since 1945.

References
 Retrieved on 2008-02-14
The Political Graveyard
James L. Cabot, Ludington: 1830-1930, p. 69. Charleston, South Carolina: Arcadia Publishing, 2005. 

1843 births
1920 deaths
Union Army soldiers
Republican Party members of the United States House of Representatives from Michigan
Republican Party members of the Michigan House of Representatives
Michigan lawyers
People from Sidney, New York
American politicians with disabilities
American amputees
University of Michigan Law School alumni
People from Hollister, California
19th-century American lawyers